Zabranena Lyubov (lit. "Forbidden Love") was a soap opera filmed in Bulgaria. Its broadcasting started on 5 October 2008, at 20:00 on Nova Television and its first season ended on 5 June 2009. The soap opera was based on the Australian TV series Sons and Daughters.

The soap opera rotates around two Sofia families, the affluent Konstantinovs and the low-income Belevs, who are mainly linked together by a central theme of love. It not only deals with the love of siblings who are unaware of each other, but also life in contemporary Bulgarian society. It has tackled controversial issues during its first season such as:  murder, arson, kidnapping, abortion, homosexuality, rape, teacher-pupil relations and so on.

Its second season started in autumn of 2009. Bulgaria's Prime Minister Boyko Borisov also had a part in one episode as himself.

Characters
The main protagonists consist of two families, the Konstantinovs and the Belevs.

Bulgarian television series
2011 Bulgarian television series endings
2008 Bulgarian television series debuts
2000s Bulgarian television series
2010s Bulgarian television series
2010s television soap operas
2000s television soap operas
Nova (Bulgarian TV channel) original programming